Gaston Rahier (1 February 1947 – 8 February 2005) was a Belgian professional motocross racer. He competed in the Motocross World Championships from 1967 to 1979, most prominently as a member of the Suzuki factory racing team where he won three consecutive FIM 125cc Motocross World Championships. In 1977, Rahier was named the recipient of the Belgian National Sports Merit Award. After his motocross career, he became a successful Rally Raid competitor.

Career
Born Herve, Wallonia, Rahier was three-time FIM World Champion in the 125cc division, claiming the title in 1975, 1976 and 1977. He later went on to race in and win the famous Paris-Dakar rally for BMW motorcycles, in 1984 and 1985. At the end of that last year he was named, alongside long-distance runner Vincent Rousseau, as the Belgian Sportsman of the Year. Rahier is a Paris-Dakar legend, once referred to as "The little man with the giant reputation." Rahier died in Paris after a long battle with cancer.

References 

1947 births
2005 deaths
People from Herve
Belgian motocross riders
Off-road motorcycle racers
Dakar Rally motorcyclists
Dakar Rally winning drivers
Belgian racing drivers
24 Hours of Spa drivers
Sportspeople from Liège Province

Graff Racing drivers
World Sportscar Championship drivers